The Sihltal Zürich Uetliberg Bahn AG – commonly abbreviated to SZU – is a railway company and transport network in the canton of Zürich in Switzerland. The network comprises the Uetliberg railway line and the Sihltal railway line, a cable car and a network of bus services.

The SZU is jointly owned by the city of Zürich (32.6%), the municipalities of Adliswil, Langnau am Albis, Horgen, Thalwil and Uitikon (6.8%), the Canton of Zürich (23.8%), the federal government (27.8%), and other parties (9%). It is constituted as an Aktiengesellschaft (AG) or public company.

History
The history of the SZU dates back to two separate companies, which built the two railways that now make up the SZU. The first of these companies was the Uetlibergbahn-Gesellschaft, which opened its line from Bahnhof Selnau in Zurich to the summit of the Uetliberg mountain in 1875. This was followed in 1892 by the Sihltalbahn company (SITB), which opened a line from Bahnhof Selnau to Sihlwald. In 1897 this latter line was extended to Sihlbrugg and a connection with the Thalwil to Zug line of the Swiss Northeastern Railway (NOB).

In 1920, the Uetlibergbahn-Gesellschaft became bankrupt and was liquidated. Two years later the Uetlibergbahn was taken over by the Bahngesellschaft Zürich–Uetliberg (BZUe). In 1923 the Uetlibergbahn was electrified using the direct current system, whilst the following year the Sihltalbahn was electrified using alternating current.

In 1932 the SITB took over the management of the BZUe, but the two companies remained in existence until 1973, when they were merged to form the SZU. In the meantime, in 1954, the SITB had taken over the management of the Adliswil-Felsenegg cable car.

This extension involved the construction of a new rail tunnel from Selnau to Zurich HB, and a new underground intermediate station adjacent to the former terminus. The underground platforms used at Zurich HB were already in existence, having been built prior to 1973 for a U-Bahn scheme that was ultimately rejected by voters. Once the new extension had been opened, the former terminus at Selnau was redeveloped and little evidence of it is now visible.

In 1995, the company took over responsibility for bus services in parts of the district of Horgen through which the Sihltalbahn is running.

In 2006, after 109 years, the Sihltalbahn stopped servicing Sihlbrugg and the last but one station Sihlwald became the new terminus.

Operation

Rail network 
The SZU continues to operate the original Uetlibergbahn and Sihltalbahn lines. A dedicated pair of underground platforms are used at the Hauptbahnhof with no rail connection to the rest of the station.

Also operated is a connecting line from Giesshübel to the Swiss Federal Railways at Zürich Wiedikon, although this is normally only used for freight traffic.

The passenger services on the two lines now form part of the S-Bahn Zürich, with the service over the Sihltalbahn to Sihlwald  branded as the S4 and the Uetlibergbahn branded as the S10.

They are unusual in that, whilst the Sihltalbahn is electrified using the standard Swiss mainline system of overhead lines at 15 kV 16.7 Hz AC, the Uetlibergbahn is electrified using overhead lines at 1200 V DC. In order to avoid conflict on the common section, the Uetlibergbahn uses an overhead line offset from the centre of the track, and its cars are equipped with specially designed pantographs to collect from this.

Other services 
The cable car Luftseilbahn Adliswil-Felsenegg (LAF for short or commonly called Felseneggbahn) is provided by the SZU, in addition to the Zimmerberg bus line (German: Zimmerbergbus) in the district of Horgen which is providing a network of  including 201 stops.

Tariffs 
The SZU was a founder member, in May 1990, of the Zürcher Verkehrsverbund (ZVV) and the standard ZVV zonal fare tariffs apply to its services.

Rolling stock 
The SZU uses the following rolling stock:

 Sihltalbahn (S4) 
 6 Locomotives Re 4/4 542–547 
 7 Control car (rail) Bt 971–973, Bt 984–987
 6 Intermediate single deck cars BD 281–285, B 293
 6 Intermediate double deck cars  B 271–276
 2 Re 456 Double deck trains (DPZ): Re 456 551, 552, B 231, 232, 241, 242 and Bt 951, 952 (two sets taken over from SBB, type Re 450)
 8 Low floor double deck cars (NDW).

 Uetlibergbahn (S10) 
 8  motor cars Be 4/4 521–528
 4  lowfloor intermediate cars B 221–224
 6 SZU Be 510 class EMUs ordered from Stadler in 2010, that entered service in 2014, equipped for dual voltage operation with movable pantograph

Notes

External links 

  
 Luftseilbahn Adliswil-Felsenegg 
 Zimmerbergbus 

Railway companies of Switzerland
Transport companies of Switzerland
Bus companies of Switzerland
Transport in the canton of Zürich
Sihl
Swiss companies established in 1875
Transport companies established in 1875
Sihltal Zürich Uetliberg Bahn